Pask may refer to;

Alun Pask (1937–1995), British rugby union player
Andrew Pask, epigeneticist
Andy Pask (born 1955), English bass player and composer
Bernard Pask (1936–1985), was an English professional footballer
Colin Pask (born 1943), British mathematical physicist and science writer
Emma Pask (born 1977), Australian jazz vocalist
Gordon Pask (1928–1996), English cybernetician and psychologist
Scott Pask, American scenic designer
Marty Pask (born 1985), Australian rules footballer
Edgar Pask, British anesthetist 
Pask Family, influential Anglo-French business family in the financial, media and real estate industries

See also 
PASK
Paska (disambiguation)